Laws of Illusion is the seventh studio album by Canadian singer-songwriter Sarah McLachlan. It was released on 11 June 2010 on Arista Records in the United States and 15 June 2010 on Nettwerk in Canada. Recording for the album took place in Montreal and Vancouver and production was handled by Pierre Marchand, with whom McLachlan has frequently collaborated in the past.

According to McLachlan, her original idea for the album's title was Loss and Illusion. When she suggested it to Marchand, he misunderstood her as saying Laws of Illusion; she chose to use that as the final title instead.

Release
Customers who pre-ordered the album through sarahmclachlan.com were given "exclusive pre-access" to tickets to the 2010 Lilith Fair along with an instant download of McLachlan's song "One Dream", which she wrote for the Vancouver Winter Olympics.

Singles
"Loving You Is Easy" was released on 23 April 2010. McLachlan's official website announced the track listing on 14 May 2010.
"Loving You Is Easy" debuted at number 28 on the Billboard Adult Contemporary Songs on the week of 29 May 2010 and has risen to number 14 as of 17 July 2010. The song also debuted at number 38 on the Billboard Adult Top 40 on the week of 26 June 2010. "Loving You Is Easy" debuted at number 86 on the Billboard Canadian Hot 100 on the week of 12 June 2010. It has so far peaked at number 59.

Chart performance
Laws of Illusion debuted at number 2 on the Canadian album charts, selling 22,000 copies in its first week of release.
The album debuted at #3 on the Billboard 200, selling 94,000 copies in its first week of release and selling an additional 38,000 copies in its second week. The album has been less successful in the UK, debuting at #76. In Australia, the album debuted at #12, making it her highest charting album there.

Critical reception

Laws of Illusion received generally favorable reviews from music critics. Allmusic noted that the album "furthers the fantasy by taking its cues from dated Clinton-era folk-pop. It’s an album that aims to soothe rather than startle, replete with wistful, lovelorn lyrics and McLachlan’s signature arrangements — a mix of new age atmospherics and singer/songwriter ambience — courtesy of longtime record producer Pierre Marchand." Rolling Stone gave the album a negative review, stating that "Sarah McLachlan's first disc since splitting from her husband, Ashwin Sood, feels scattered: The carefree single 'Loving You Is Easy' feels out of place. The rest alternates between vulnerability and bitterness, using the same sighs and moans with which she used to convey ecstasy." SputnikMusic gave the album 4 stars and praised McLachlan's musical return to the style she explored in her earlier albums, such as Surfacing, Touch and Solace. Slant gave the album rather negative review noting that "Laws of Illusion sounds both effortless and effort-less."

Track listing

"·" Tracks that feature piano versions/video on Deluxe Edition
Japanese Edition Includes 2 Bonus Tracks - "Loving You Is Easy" (Acoustic), "One Dream"

Personnel
Credits for Laws of Illusion adapted from Allmusic.
Musicians
 Sarah McLachlan – guitar (acoustic), piano, composer, glockenspiel, harmonium, vocals, vocals (background), wurlitzer
 Matt Chamberlain – percussion, drums
 Colin Cripps – guitar (acoustic), guitar (electric), vocals (background)
 Yves Desrosiers – guitar (acoustic), guitar (electric), lap steel guitar, slide bass
 Bill Dillon – guitar (acoustic), guitar (electric)
 Luke Doucet – guitar (acoustic), dobro, guitar (electric), vocals (background)
 Robbie Kuster – percussion, drums, vocals (background)
 J.F. Lemieux – bass, vocals (background)
 Catherine Lesaunier – cello
 Maxime St-Pierre – trumpet, flugelhorn
 Pierre Marchand – guitar (acoustic), bass, composer, glockenspiel, harmonium, keyboards, vocals (background), producer, engineer, mixing, tack piano
 Michel Pepin – guitar (acoustic), guitar (electric)

Technical personnel
 Chris Potter – engineer
 Kharen Hill – photography, cover photo, tray photo
 Raphael Mazzucco – photography
 John Rummen – design
 Pascal Shefteshy – engineer, mixing assistant
 Adam Ayan – mastering
 Fred Bouchard – pro-tools
Kharen Hill - photography for album artwork and publicity

Charts

Weekly charts

Year-end charts

Release history

References

2010 albums
Sarah McLachlan albums
Nettwerk Records albums
Arista Records albums
Albums produced by Pierre Marchand